Michael McLean (born 9 April 1970) is a Canadian sprinter. He competed in the men's 400 metres at the 1992 Summer Olympics.

References

External links
 

1970 births
Living people
Athletes (track and field) at the 1992 Summer Olympics
Canadian male sprinters
Olympic track and field athletes of Canada
Commonwealth Games competitors for Canada
Athletes (track and field) at the 1990 Commonwealth Games
Athletes (track and field) at the 1991 Pan American Games
Saint Vincent and the Grenadines emigrants to Canada
Black Canadian track and field athletes
People from Kingstown
Pan American Games track and field athletes for Canada